The 4 Brothers Meet Misery Skull is a punk rock album by Balzac from 1998.

Track listing
"Off the Wall (promotion film version)"
"When the Fiendish Ghouls (4th single limited edition 308 pressing)"
"Devil's Whorehouse (the Misfits tribute "Hell on Earth...Hail to Misfits")" 
"Sad Nos. 1999 (demo version 3rd album "13 Stairway")"
"Just the Bleeding Light (demo version 3rd album "13 Stairway")" 
"Day the Earth Caught Fire (Live at Dracula Castle 1998)"
"Monster I (Live at Dracula Castle 1998)" 
"Horrorwood (unreleased version)"

Personnel
 Hirosuke - vocals
 Atsushi - guitar
 Akio - bass guitar
 Kill - drums

References

Balzac (band) albums
1998 compilation albums
Horror punk compilation albums